Wilson Clyde (born 8 April 1934) is a former Unionist politician from Northern Ireland representing the Democratic Unionist Party (DUP). 

Born in Kilbegs, County Antrim, Clyde worked as a farmer before being elected to Antrim Borough Council for the Democratic Unionist Party in 1981.  In 1996, he was elected to the Northern Ireland Forum, representing South Antrim, and he held the seat at the 1998 and 2003 elections to the Northern Ireland Assembly.  He was deselected by the DUP for the 2007 election.

References
The Northern Ireland Assembly: Wilson Clyde

1934 births
Living people
People from County Antrim
Democratic Unionist Party MLAs
Members of the Northern Ireland Forum
Northern Ireland MLAs 1998–2003
Northern Ireland MLAs 2003–2007
Members of Antrim Borough Council
Farmers from Northern Ireland